Captain William Parkinson Wright (born 1846, Illinois; d. 1933, Pennsylvania) was a veteran of the American Civil War. He was an officer in the 156th Illinois Volunteer Infantry during the war.  He was the 25th Commander-in-Chief, Military Order of the Loyal Legion of the United States (MOLLUS) (1931-1933) and the 66th Commander-in-Chief, Grand Army of the Republic (1932-1933).

Wright was the last Commander-in-Chief of the MOLLUS who was a veteran of the Civil War.

Early life
Write was born on March 29, 1846, in Naperville, DuPage County, Illinois.

Civil War service
After he turned age 18, he enlisted in the Union Army in May 1864 as a private in Company I, 132nd Illinois Volunteer Infantry Regiment. He was discharged with the rank of corporal in the fall of the same year by reason of expiration of term of service (100 Days). He re-enlisted as the 1st Sergeant of Company D, 156th Illinois Volunteer Infantry on February 25, 1865. He was discharged by reason of promotion as 2nd Lieutenant effective on June 2, 1865.  He was commissioned as a captain on July 26, 1865.

During his time of service with the 132nd Illinois he was on duty at Paducah, Kentucky and Columbus, Kentucky. The 156th assigned duty was guarding the railroad between Chattanooga, Tennessee and Dalton, Georgia. On July 5, 1865 he was ordered to Memphis, Tennessee when his regiment was assigned to patrol duty.  In September 1865, Wright was mustered out of service with his regiment at Springfield, Illinois.

Post-bellum life
After the war he worked as a real estate broker in the Chicago area.

Soon after the war, Wright became an early member of the Grand Army of the Republic. He served as commander of the Walter Blanchard Post in Napierville, Illinois and of the Abraham Lincoln Post in Chicago. He served as Commander of the Department of Illinois from May 1921 to May 1922 and also served as President of the Board of Directors of the Grand Army Hall and Memorial Association of Illinois.

Wright was elected a Companion of the First Class of the MOLLUS through the Illinois Commandery on July 24, 1894. He was assigned Insignia No. 10240. He was elected Commander of the Illinois Commandery and then Treasurer-in-Chief.

Write was elected as the last Commander-in-Chief of the MOLLUS to have served in the Civil War on October 28, 1931. The next year, he was elected as Commander-in-Chief of the Grand Army of the Republic (GAR).  He is the only person to have held both offices.

Wright died on June 15, 1933 in Pittsburgh, Pennsylvania while still in office as commander-in-chief of both the MOLLUS and the GAR.

His son, Henry Delco Wright, was a hereditary companion of the MOLLUS and was assigned insignia number 11547.

References
Biography of William P. Wright by Douglas Niermeyer

1846 births
1933 deaths
Union Army officers
Grand Army of the Republic Commanders-in-Chief
People from Naperville, Illinois
Military personnel from Illinois